was a poet and playwright active during the Shōwa period in Japan. He also was a scriptwriter.

Biography
Born in Tokyo, Nagata was the brother of fellow writer Nagata Hideo. Influenced by his brother, and his brother's associates Kitahara Hakushū and Yoshii Isamu, he also turned to poetry and literature as a career, He contributed to the literary journal Myōjō and Subaru while still a student at Waseda University, but left university without graduating and went to Hokkaido to work as a laborer at coal mines and at railroad construction sites.

Nagata and Jun'ichirō Tanizaki were close friends, even to the extent that Nagata used the pen name “Mikihiko Jun'ichirō” on some of his early works; however, after Tanizaki went to Kyoto in 1912, their relations deteriorated, and afterwards they had little contact.

Nagata is best known for his semi-factual work on the Great Kantō earthquake, Daichi wa furu ("The Earth Shakes", 1923) and for numerous works on the Gion district of Kyoto. He later turned to scriptwriting and directed a theatrical troupe. In 1947, he staged a play called Shōwa Ichidai Onna ("A Woman of the Shōwa period"), which starred the notorious Sada Abe, who had been released from prison shortly before, in a one-act dramatization of her crime.

Nagata died of pneumonia in 1964, and his grave is at the Kanei-ji Cemetery in Ueno, Tokyo.

See also
 Japanese literature
 List of Japanese authors

References

Johnston, William. GEISHA - HARLOT - STRANGLER - STAR: A Woman, Sex, And Morality in Modern Japan. Columbia University Press (2005).  page 152.
Kunimoto, Tadao. Japanese Literature Since 1868. Hokuseido Press (1938). 

1887 births
1964 deaths
20th-century Japanese novelists
People from Tokyo
Waseda University alumni
20th-century Japanese poets